Dolichol kinase deficiency is a cutaneous condition caused by a mutation in the dolichol kinase gene.

It is also known as Congenital disorder of glycosylation 1m.

See also 
 CEDNIK syndrome
 List of cutaneous conditions

References

External links 

Genodermatoses
Glycoprotein metabolism disorders